Martyre is the second full-length album released by doom metal band Saturnus.

Track listing
 "7"  1:54
 "Inflame Thy Heart"  6:42
 "Empty Handed"  4:12
 "Noir"  5:33
 "A Poem (Written In Moonlight)"  5:41
 "Softly on the Path You Fade"  7:07
 "Thou Art Free"  4:36
 "Drown My Sorrow"  6:50
 "Lost My Way"  4:47
 "Loss (In Memoriam)"  6:49
 "Thus My Heart Weepeth for Thee"  6:12
 "In Your Shining Eyes"  2:36

References

2000 albums
Saturnus (band) albums
Albums produced by Flemming Rasmussen